Alanngorsuaq is a  mountain in the Qeqqata municipality in western Greenland.

Geography 
Alanngorsuaq is a standalone mountain, separated from the Nasaasaaq massif in the south by a shallow saddle. The range flattens considerably towards the east in the area of Kangaamiut dike swarm north of Kangerlussuaq, due to pressure exerted by the icesheet for long periods in the past.

Topography 
The  summit ridge of Alanngorsuaq is of roughly east–west direction, with the summit in the center. The southern slope falls mildly towards the saddle, while the northeastern wall falls with a steep cliff in its western part, gradually easing towards the east. It is the only part of the massif of interest to mountaineers.

Tourism

Recreation 
Alanngorsuaq is surrounded by several lakes to the west and northwest, one of which serves Sisimiut town as a water reservoir. Sisimiut valley is the primary recreation areas for the townspeople, with easy access to the reservoirs by a gravel road in the middle part of the valley. The summit itself is very frequently visited from the southern side for its wide view over the valley and the mountain ranges encircling it from three sides.

Skiing 
Cross-country skiing around the mountain is popular in winter, while a small lift for downhill skiing is installed on the southern slope, due south of the summit.

Polar Route 
The tough,  Arctic Circle Race takes place each winter, with the trail partially overlapping with the Polar Route from Sisimiut to Kangerlussuaq. The race was inaugurated in 1998, since then becoming an international competition. The Polar Route passes through the saddle between Nasaasaaq and Alanngorsuaq, and the summit is sometimes visited by way of a variant.

References 

Davis Strait
Mountains of Greenland
Sisimiut